Rubtsovsky District is an administrative and municipal district (raion), one of the fifty-nine in Altai Krai, Russia. It is located in the southwest of the krai. Its administrative center is the city of Rubtsovsk (which is not administratively a part of the district). Population:

Administrative and municipal status
Within the framework of administrative divisions, Rubtsovsky District is one of the fifty-nine in the krai. The city of Rubtsovsk serves as its administrative center, despite being incorporated separately as a city of krai significance—an administrative unit with the status equal to that of the districts.

As a municipal division, the district is incorporated as Rubtsovsky Municipal District. The city of krai significance of Rubtsovsk is incorporated separately from the district as Rubtsovsk Urban Okrug.

References

Notes

Sources

Districts of Altai Krai

